Ahmed Mohamed Iman (Somali: Axmed Maxamed Iimaan) is a Director General of the Ministry of Public Works Reconistraction  & Housing Federal Government of Somalia and former Director General of the Fisheries, Marine Resources and Environment Sector of the Ministry of the National Resources of Somalia.

He is also an author. His books included Toosiye Everyday English for Everyone with translated into Somali), Marine Ecosystem Data Gathered of Somalia, Taariikhda Taxan iyo Dhaqanka Soomaaliya, (a book about the History and Culture of Somalia and Dagaalka Badda Somalia. He educated political Science and MBA, Specialization of HRM (Human Resource Management. He also learned Integrating Coastal Zone Management.

References

 

Somalian politicians
Living people
Year of birth missing (living people)